Meridarchis mesosticha is a moth in the Carposinidae family. It was described by John David Bradley in 1965 and is found in Uganda.

References

Arctiidae genus list at Butterflies and Moths of the World of the Natural History Museum

Carposinidae
Moths described in 1965